2014 Palestine International Championship was a friendly football tournament organized by the Palestinian Football Association. The competition is held this year between 10–21 May 2014.  All 4 Olympic national teams played against each other on a round-robin basis in a single group. The group winners and runners-up advanced to the final.

Participants
 (withdrew)

 (hosts)

Group
All times are local time (UTC+02:00).

Final

Goalscorers

References

External links

2014
2013–14 in Palestinian football
2013–14 in Jordanian football
2013–14 in Pakistani football
2013–14 in Sri Lankan football